Lin Bo (born 20 October 1962) is a Chinese sailor. He competed in the men's 470 event at the 1988 Summer Olympics.

References

External links
 

1962 births
Living people
Chinese male sailors (sport)
Olympic sailors of China
Sailors at the 1988 Summer Olympics – 470
Place of birth missing (living people)